Eric Masterson is a fictional superhero appearing in American comic books published by Marvel Comics. The character has appeared as Thor and later Thunderstrike. The character was introduced as a supporting character in the Thor title, but continued in several other comic books, including the self-titled series Thunderstrike in 1993. Later interpretations of Thunderstrike would appear in both the Marvel Comics 2 and Heroic Age Marvel Comics storylines, featuring the character's son as the hero.

Publication history
Eric Masterson first appeared in Thor #391, as a supporting character. Thor #408 featured the merging of the character Eric Masterson with Thor, Masterson being utilized as the God of Thunder's alter ego until issue #432. Thor #432 featured the character assuming the role of Thor, and appearing as the title character until Thor #459.

Following Thor #459, Masterson was introduced as "Thunderstrike" in the eponymous series starting in June 1993. The series lasted approximately two years. Thunderstrike ran for 24 issues, the series canceled in September 1995. Creator Tom DeFalco has often claimed that the book outsold Thor and The Avengers combined at the time of its cancellation; although this has been shown to be extremely unlikely. Masterson also appeared in the mini-series Thor Corps as Thunderstrike, and appeared as a guest star in the Thor series.

The character was featured in the Avengers from issue #343 until issue #374, and crossover series Operation: Galactic Storm. Masterson also appeared in the mini-series Infinity Gauntlet and Infinity War. Outside the many appearances in Thor and Avengers, Thunderstrike was used to launch an ongoing series Blackwulf, and a limited series Code: B.L.U.E.

It was announced that the Thunderstrike character would be returning in a new miniseries by co-creators Tom DeFalco and Ron Frenz in November 2010. Promotionals leading into the event began in August depicting the mace stating "One will rise..." and "The World Still Needs Heroes." Ultimately, the new Thunderstrike miniseries featured Eric Masterson's son, Kevin, in the role once inhabited by his father.

Fictional character biography

First encounter
Eric Kevin Masterson was working as an architect when he met Thor. Masterson was injured by falling girders, and was taken to the hospital by Thor. Now on crutches, Masterson was attacked by Quicksand, but saved by Thor. Masterson was then abducted by Mongoose. Masterson accompanied Thor to the Black Galaxy, where he first met Hercules. Masterson, mortally wounded by Mongoose, was given Thor's form and powers after the original was sealed in Eric's mind, by Odin, to save Eric's life. Recognizing that his new life as Thor was too dangerous for a child, Masterson gave up custody of his son Kevin to his ex-wife Marcy, reasoning that Kevin would be safer with her, even if she was relatively ambivalent about her role as a mother. Masterson was then separated from Thor by the Red Celestial. Shortly thereafter, Masterson saved Thor's life, and was merged with him again. Masterson's son Kevin was captured by Ulik for Loki. Thor freed Kevin and seemingly slew Loki in battle. Heimdall separated Thor from Masterson, then banished Thor, and transformed Masterson into a new Thor. He then met the Enchantress as Leena Moran, and battled Ulik.

Surrogate of Thor

Eric continued in the role of Thor, after having been given Mjolnir by Thor, who then told Eric to carry on as Earth's protector. Eric then returned to Earth and joined the Avengers in Thor's place. Masterson revealed his double identity to Captain America. He then first visited Asgard, where he fought the Warriors Three, Balder, Heimdall, and Sif, while trying to discover the whereabouts of the real Thor. Masterson then helped rescue the sleeping Odin from Annihilus. He teamed with Beta Ray Bill and Dargo Ktor as the "Thor Corps" against Zarrko and Loki. During his time with the Avengers as Thor, Masterson aided them in such battles as the Kree/Shi'ar war and the Infinity Gauntlet crisis, being one of only three heroes at the conclusion of that battle to remember the entire confrontation (the other two being Doctor Strange and the Silver Surfer) as he had briefly witnessed Warlock's soul during the fight.

Thunderstrike is born
Eric's role as Thor was relatively brief, as the Enchantress manipulated Eric into attacking Thor for Sif's affection. During a confrontation with Thor, Eric struck Sif. This provoked Thor, leading him to defeat Eric and reclaim Mjolnir while Odin revealed the Enchantress's manipulations. Odin then ordered the creation of a new mace for Eric, called Thunderstrike.

Eric first used the Thunderstrike mace against the villains Bloodaxe and Carjack, but he was promptly defeated. Afterwards, Eric created his own costume to distinguish himself from Thor, while keeping Thor's reputation intact. Eric renamed himself Thunderstrike, after the mace itself, operating as an adventurer and crimefighter. Eventually Eric defeated Bloodaxe, only to discover that Bloodaxe was actually Jackie Lukus, his current love interest.

Final conflicts and death
After a confrontation with Seth the Egyptian god of death, Eric realized that the only way to defeat him was to succumb to the curse contained with the Bloodaxe and increase his strength. After his supposed slaying of Seth, Eric was confronted by the Avengers, who attempted to arrest him for murder. Instead, Masterson defeated the Avengers, and Thor confronted him. Eric pleaded with Thor to kill him to prevent the curse of the Bloodaxe from taking him over completely. But Eric was eventually forced to fight the Bloodaxe subconsciously, which manifested in Eric's mind in the form of Skurge. Eric eventually defeated the Skurge duplicate, causing a psychic backlash that killed him and destroyed the two weapons. Claiming that Valhalla was not where he belonged, Eric was sent into the afterlife by Odin.

Returns from and to the dead
Eric was temporarily resurrected by the Grim Reaper several years later, along with several other deceased Avengers. After overcoming the Grim Reaper's control, he and the other undead Avengers were returned to the afterlife by the Scarlet Witch. Before he returned to the afterlife, Eric asked Thor to check in on his son Kevin for him.

Successor
Eric's Thunderstrike mace (revealed to have been repaired by Thor and left in custody of the Avengers) was eventually given by Commander Steve Rogers to Kevin Masterson, who went on to become the new Thunderstrike and succeed his own father in the use of that identity.

Powers and abilities
Eric's abilities are derived from the enchanted mace Thunderstrike, made of mystic uru metal, which is nearly indestructible, crafted by the Asgardian dwarves Brokk and Eitri, and given the following enchantments by Odin:

 Stamping the mace reverts Thunderstrike back to Eric's mortal human form, dressed in whichever clothes he last wore in that form, with any physical damage fully healed--with the exception of certain mystical spells such as Seth's Mark of Death, while the mace Thunderstrike transforms into a wooden cane. By stamping his walking stick on the ground Eric Masterson transforms back into his superhuman form, bearded, mustachioed, and dressed in the garb of Thunderstrike, while the cane again becomes the mace.
 The mace itself can be thrown over great distances and return to the point it is thrown from. By throwing the mace and gripping the strap, Thunderstrike can fly. (However, the comic emphasizes that Thunderstrike's is much rockier and less steady than Thor's flight.) He can use the mace to fire powerful concussive blasts of mystical energy. The mace magically enables him to survive the adverse conditions of outer space, including its lack of oxygen. The mace can also be used for tracking various energy sources and has the ability to create mystical vortices to travel from one place to another.
 Thunderstrike's physical abilities are enhanced to superhuman levels, including his strength, speed, durability, agility, reflexes, and endurance.

As Thunderstrike, Masterson's appearance is identical to that of Thor, hence his superhuman form possesses Asgardian physiology. While his superhuman abilities were significantly above those of most Asgardians, his strength, stamina and durability were only a fraction of Thor's. He is a formidable hand-to-hand combatant, and has received some combat training from Captain America and Hercules.
As Masterson, he is a highly skilled architect, with a master's degree in architecture. He is near-sighted, and wears eye-glasses.

Enemies
In his comic series, Thunderstrike has fought an array of enemies:

 Absorbing Man - A supervillain who can absorb the properties of anything.
 Bison - Billy Kitson is a former basketball player whose leg got broke when he was accidentally tripped by another player. Seth turned him into the bull-like Bison to serve him where Seth will restore him to normal and heal his leg if his mission is a success.
 Bloodaxe - A villain who fought Thunderstrike on occasion.
 Bristle - A servant of Tantalus who can fire sharp quills from his wrists.
 Juggernaut - The stepbrother of Professor X who is empowered by the Gem of the Cytorrak.
 Khult - A Deviant from the planet Tebbel who is the son-in-law of Tantalus.
 Loki - The Norse God of Mischief.
 Mephisto - A demon and enemy of Thor and Ghost Rider who once manipulated Thunderstrike into stealing the Golden Apples of Idunn.
 Mongoose - A mongoose that was experimented on by the High Evolutionary.
 Pandara - A former gym teacher that possesses a box that can release demons and drain energy from people.
 Quicksand - A female supervillain with sand-based powers.
 Sangre - Julia Concepcion is a police officer who became an assassin after her son was the victim of a heinous crime.
 Schizo - A servant of Tantalus.
 Seth - The Egyptian God of Evil.
 Stegron - A Stegosaurus-themed supervillain.
 Tantalus - A Deviant.
 Lucian - A Deviant and the son of Tantalus.
 Titania - A super-strong female supervillain and Absorbing Man's girlfriend.
 Whyteout - Stuart Anthony Whyte is a scientist who developed a special stealth that can white out anything at will. He was seemingly killed by Bloodaxe.

In other media

Television
Eric Masterson / Thunderstrike has a non-speaking cameo appearance in the Avengers: Ultron Revolution animated series episode "Into the Future". This version hails from a possible future where he opposes Kang the Conqueror alongside Black Widow, Hawkeye, Iron Woman, and Joaquin Torres.

Video games
 Eric Masterson / Thunderstrike made a cameo appearance as a non-playable character at the end of Spider-Man and Venom: Maximum Carnage alongside the rest of the Avengers.
 Eric Masterson / Thunderstrike appears as a playable character in the arcade fighting game Avengers in Galactic Storm.
 Eric Masterson / Thunderstrike appears as a playable character in Lego Marvel's Avengers.

Collected editions

References

External links
 
 
 Thunderstrike (Eric Masterson) at Marvel Wiki

 Thunderstrike (item) at Marvel Wiki

Marvel Comics superheroes
Marvel Comics magical objects
Marvel Comics weapons
Set index articles on comics

1993 comics debuts
Avengers (comics) characters
Characters created by Ron Frenz
Characters created by Tom DeFalco
Comics characters introduced in 1993
Fictional architects
Fictional characters with superhuman durability or invulnerability
Marvel Comics characters who can move at superhuman speeds
Marvel Comics characters who use magic
Marvel Comics characters with accelerated healing
Marvel Comics characters with superhuman strength
Marvel Comics mutates
Thor (Marvel Comics)
Comics characters introduced in 1988
Fictional characters from parallel universes
Marvel Comics 2